Singh Saab the Great is a 2013 Indian Hindi-language action drama film directed by Anil Sharma. The film stars Sunny Deol, Urvashi Rautela, Amrita Rao and Prakash Raj as main characters. The film marks the return of Sunny Deol to action genre after a long time. Also, Deol and Sharma paired up once again after Gadar: Ek Prem Katha. The film narrates the story of a man who decides to teach a lesson to the man, who ruined his life, by reforming him. The film's story and screenplay has been written by Shaktimaan Talwar, and the action sequences have been directed by Tinu Verna and Kanal Kannan. The music has been provided by Anand Raj Anand and Sonu Nigam. Amisha Patel was supposed to play the lead role but backed out due to ever changing schedules. The film released officially on 22 November 2013.

Plot 
A common man works as a tax collector in a small city. A TV journalist uncovers the mysterious hero's back story. It starts in a small village named Chironji, with a small argument about food issues in a village caused by a local goon named Jatta Singh when Singh Saab (Sunny Deol) makes his grand entry. Singh Saab is an honest, noble and loyal man. Above all else, he lives his life on honest principles and that makes him a messiah of common people. and he came with the offer from his movement named People's Beat, which is for a noble cause, approached to Jatta Singh to let the goods from his factories to be used for a good cause. This enrages Jatta Singh and attacks Singh Saab. He denies to hit back to honor the day, which was 2 October, Non-Violence Day. But things got messy, and Singh Saab and Jatta have a duel.

Then they get several invitations, which of one from Bhadhori, upsets him, and a TV reporter named Shikha Chuturvadi (Amrita Rao) approached to him and believes that he is living a noble life as a hoax. Then he was shaken and decided to tell her about the story of his life revolving around the name Bhadhori. It flashes back to 7 years earlier, the time when he was known as Saranjeet Singh Talwar, an IAS officer. He was travelling with his loving wife Minnie (Urvashi Rautela) to a small city Bhadhori, where he was transferred as the Collector. There he starts a court of justice for action to be taken against corrupt individuals.

There he meets a gangster alias a crime lord named Raja Dadta Bhudhev Singh (Prakash Raj). He has an excise of Rupees 32,029,000 to pay and he threatens Saranjeet to open his factories otherwise he will do something to his sister and ruin her marriage. This enrages Saranjeet and he then slaps Bhudhev which led to a threat to ruin Saranjeet's life and will make him squeal. Things get messy when Bhudhev kidnaps Saranjeet's sister's father-in-law and makes him to obey his order to mix poison in the ritual of feeding sweets to the daughter-in-law and son, or the whole family will be poisoned. He tries but attempts to fail and Saranjeet finds that things are fishy. He is called by Bhudhev and finds out that Minnie was poisoned, by the cause of her drink being spiked with poison.

They rush her to the hospital and Bhudhev has made a deal to exchange the order of his factories’ release for Dr. Anand, the neurosurgeon to perform the surgery for Minnie's survival. Saranjeet agrees for Minnie's unstable condition. But, it gets to late and Minnie passes away. Saranjeet is heartbroken and had found an old letter written by his wife during her last minutes. Furious Saranjeet goes to Bhudev and attacks him. He is then sentenced for 16 years of imprisonment.

But, one day he met his old friend, Mohammad Iqbal (Rajit Kapur) who was the jailor official, and recommended to bring change not hatred. Now in present day, he is a dedicated man towards bringing a noble change to the society.

Cast
 Sunny Deol as Saranjit Singh Talwar
 Urvashi Rautela as Minnie Talwar
 Amrita Rao as Shikha Chaturvedi
 Prakash Raj as Bhoodev Singh
 Anjali Abrol as Simar / Guddie
 Johny Lever as Gulwinder
 Rajit Kapur as Jailer Mohammad Iqbal
 Manoj Pahwa as Govardhan
 Yashpal Sharma as Lallan Singh
 Shahbaz Khan as Jatta Singh
 Raj Premi as Sultan
 Alan Kapoor as Ashwini
 Dr. Anukool Jain as Press Reporter
 Dharmendra as in a (guest appearance) in song "Daaru Band Kal Se"
 Bobby Deol as in a (guest appearance) in song "Daaru Band Kal Se"
 Simran Khan as an item number "Khaike Palang Todh Pan"
 Satya Vrat Mudgal as Rampal

Music

The soundtrack album was composed by the music director Anand Raj Anand and Sonu Nigam composed the title track of the movie while the lyrics were penned by Kumaar. The music was launched on 29 Oct 2013. The album contains six songs.

Reception
Singh Saab The Great received mostly positive reviews from critics. David Chute of Variety praised Deol's action sequences.

NDTV rated the movie as 3.5/5 stars, saying "There is a virility and fluency to the storytelling. Singh Saab The Great is a homage to the cinema of the 1980s when Sunny was macho." Filmfare gave the film 4/5 stars, saying "SSTG is a mass entertainer. It's a Sunny Deol vehicle. Sunny Paaji is obviously on top of this game. His comedy punches, stirring Punjabi dialogues are all over top but perfectly suitable in context of film".

The Times of India gave movie 3/5 stars, stating  "Like all films that talk of reforming society, Anil Sharma's Singh Saab the Great has its heart in the correct place. Sunny Deol's earnestness shines, throughout the duration of this melodrama". Taran Adarsh of Bollywood Hungama gave a 3.5/5 star rating and wrote "Singh Saab the Great is a typical Sunny Deol film that a section of the audience still enjoys. The clapworthy dialogue, the raw appeal, the undercurrent of emotions and of course, the dhaai kilo ka haath should appeal to those who relish desi fares, especially the single screen audience".

Box office

The film's total box office collections totaled approximately 36 Crore in India on a 25 Crore budget. Making the film an above average grosser at the box office.

See also
List of Bollywood films of 2013

References

External links
 

2010s Hindi-language films
2013 films
Indian action drama films
2013 action drama films
Films scored by Anand Raj Anand
Films directed by Anil Sharma